Henceforth is a Brazilian progressive metal band.  Formed in 1993, they released their first album in Brazil in December 2005 via Voice Music (label owned by Silvio Golfetti, guitar player in the Brazilian thrash metal band Korzus). The current line-up is made up by Frank Harris (vocals), Hugo Mariutti (guitar), Luis Mariutti (bass), Fabio Elsas (drums) and Cristiano Altieri (keyboard). Luis and Hugo are members of another band called Shaman, and Luis is a former member of power metal band Angra - as of 2007 they are no longer in Shaman having left the band with singer Andre Matos in order to pursue new projects. Fabio has played in the past with Skyscraper and Firebox, besides his first band with Hugo Mariutti, Wardeath.

Musical groups established in 1993
Brazilian progressive metal musical groups
Musical quintets
1993 establishments in Brazil